Vernon Hargreaves III (born June 3, 1995) is an American football cornerback who is currently a free agent. He played college football at Florida and was drafted 11th overall by the Tampa Bay Buccaneers in the 2016 NFL Draft.

Early years
Hargreaves attended Wharton High School in Tampa, Florida, where he played football. As a sophomore in 2010, he had 44 tackles, two sacks, and two interceptions. As a junior in 2011, he had 49 tackles and two interceptions, along with 11 offensive touchdowns. As a senior in 2012, he had 110 tackles and five interceptions.  He was recognized as the most valuable player (MVP) of the 2013 Under Armour All-America Game.

In addition to football, Hargreaves competed in track & field at Wharton. As a senior in 2012, he posted a personal-best time of 22.56 seconds in the 200-meter dash at the Hillsborough County National Division. At the FHSAA District Meet, he placed fourth in the 100-meter dash (11.10 s), second in the long jump and twelfth in the high jump.

Regarded as a five-star recruit by Rivals.com, Hargreaves was ranked as the nation's best cornerback recruit and the second best player overall.

College career
Hargreaves accepted an athletic scholarship to attend the University of Florida, where he has played for head coaches Will Muschamp and Jim McElwain's Florida Gators football teams in Southeastern Conference (SEC) competition in 2013, 2014, and 2015. As a true freshman in 2013, he started 10 of 12 games, recording 38 tackles and three interceptions, and received first-team All-SEC honors at the cornerback position. As a sophomore, he played 12 games with three interceptions, 13 passes defended, and two fumble recoveries on 50 tackles. As a junior, he made four interceptions, a forced fumble, and four passes defended on 33 tackles in 12 games. He earned All-SEC honors. After his junior year, he announced his intentions forgo his senior season and enter the 2016 NFL Draft.

Statistics

Professional career
Hargreaves was projected to be a first round pick by NFL draft experts and scouts. He was ranked the top cornerback prospect in the draft by DraftScout.com and NFL analyst Daniel Jeremiah, was ranked the second best cornerback in the draft by NFL analysts Mike Mayock, Lance Zierlein, and Bucky Brooks, and was ranked the second best defensive back in the draft by Sports Illustrated and NFL analyst Charles Davis.

Tampa Bay Buccaneers

2016
The Tampa Bay Buccaneers selected Hargreaves in the first round (11th overall) of the 2016 NFL Draft. He was the third cornerback to be selected after Jalen Ramsey and Eli Apple and the first of seven Florida Gators in 2016.

On May 6, 2016, the Tampa Bay Buccaneers signed Hargreaves to fully guaranteed four-year, $14.17 million contract that includes a signing bonus of $8.51 million.

Throughout training camp, he participated in an open competition to name a starting cornerback against Brent Grimes, Johnthan Banks, Alterraun Verner, Jude Adjei-Barimah, and Joel Ross. Head coach Dirk Koetter named Hargreaves the third cornerback on the depth chart, behind Brent Grimes and Alterraun Verner.

He made his professional regular season debut and first career start in the Tampa Bay Buccaneers' season-opener at the Atlanta Falcons and recorded two combined tackles during a 31–24 victory. He made his first career tackle on wide receiver Justin Hardy in the first quarter. On October 30, 2016, Hargreaves collected a season-high eight solo tackles and two pass deflections during a 30–24 overtime loss to the Oakland Raiders in Week 8. In Week 14, Hargreaves made three solo tackles, broke up a pass, and made his first career interception off a pass by Drew Brees in the Buccaneers' 16–11 victory against the New Orleans Saints. He finished his rookie season with 76 combined tackles (68 solo), nine pass deflections, and an interception in 16 games and 16 starts.

2017
Head coach Dirk Koetter retained Grimes and Hargreaves as the starting cornerbacks to begin the 2017 regular season. On October 1, 2017, Hargreaves recorded a career-high nine solo tackles and deflected a pass during a 25–23 victory against the New York Giants in Week 4. In Week 8, he tied his season-high of two pass deflections and recorded six combined tackles during a 17–3 loss to the Carolina Panthers. On November 12, 2017, Hargreaves made three combined tackles before exiting the Buccaneers' 15–10 win against the New York Jets in the third quarter after sustaining a hamstring injury. He was inactive for the next five games (Weeks 11–15) before the Buccaneers opted to place him on injured reserve on December 20, 2017. He finished his second season with 42 combined tackles (37 solo) and five pass deflections in nine games and eight starts.

2018
In Week 1, against the New Orleans Saints, Hargreaves recorded seven combined tackles, one pass defensed and forced a fumble that was recovered by Justin Evans and returned for a touchdown. He suffered a shoulder injury in the game and was placed on injured reserve on September 12, 2018.

2019
On April 24, 2019, the Buccaneers exercised the fifth-year option on Hargreaves contract.
In Week 1 against the San Francisco 49ers, Hargreaves intercepted Jimmy Garoppolo and returned it 15 yards for a touchdown in the 31–17 loss. In Week 2 against the Carolina Panthers, Hargreaves made 12 tackles, including making a pivotal stop during fourth down by pushing running back Christian McCaffrey out of bounds short of the first down marker in a 20–14 win. After starting the first nine games of the season, Hargreaves was waived by the Buccaneers on November 12, 2019.

Houston Texans
On November 13, 2019, Hargreaves was claimed off waivers by the Houston Texans. He was released on February 14, 2020, but re-signed with the Texans on April 6.

In Week 9 of the 2020 season against the Jacksonville Jaguars, Hargreaves recorded his first interception as a Texan off a pass thrown by Jake Luton during the 27–25 win.

On March 17, 2021, Hargreaves signed a contract extension with the Texans. He entered the season as a starting cornerback. He started five of eight games played before being released on November 3.

Cincinnati Bengals
On November 4, 2021, Hargreaves was claimed off waivers by the Cincinnati Bengals. Hargreaves was penalized 15 yards for running onto the field in Super Bowl LVI, despite being inactive for the game. Six days later, Hargreaves was fined $5,555.

NFL career statistics

Personal life
His father Vernon Hargreaves Jr. is a college football coach who won a national championship as the linebackers coach for the Miami Hurricanes in 2001.

References

External links

Florida Gators bio

1995 births
Living people
Players of American football from Tampa, Florida
American football cornerbacks
Florida Gators football players
All-American college football players
Tampa Bay Buccaneers players
Houston Texans players
Cincinnati Bengals players